Franciosa is a surname. Notable people with the surname include: 

Anthony Franciosa (1928–2006), American actor
Massimo Franciosa (1924–1998), Italian screenwriter and film director

See also
Franciosi